Vira Ravi Ravi Varma was Raja of Venad, also known as the Kingdom of Quilon, between 1484 and 1503.  He was a member of the Kulasekhara Dynasty, predecessors of the Travancore Rajas.  He moved the capital from Kallidaikurichi to Padmanabhapuram about 1500. He was the ruler of Venad when the Portuguese arrived in India.

References

Rulers of Quilon
15th-century Indian monarchs
Year of birth unknown
1504 deaths